Diomid may refer to:
 Diomid Dzyuban, a Russian Orthodox priest / monk
 George Blake, a British spy for the Soviet Union whose KGB code name was 'Diomid'